The 1998 Tour de Langkawi was the third edition of the Tour de Langkawi, a cycling stage race that took place in Malaysia. It started on 18 February in Langkawi and ended on 1 March in Kuala Lumpur. The race was sanctioned by the Union Cycliste Internationale (UCI) as a 2.5 category race.

Italian Gabriele Missaglia won the race, Giuliano Figueras second and Niklas Axelsson third. Fred Rodriguez also won the points classification and Douglas Ryder won the mountains classification of the race.  won the team classification of the race.

Stages
The cyclist competed in 12 stages over 12 days, covering a distance of 1,835.7 kilometres.

Classification leadership

Final standings

General classification

Points classification

Mountains classification

Asian rider classification

Team classification

Asian team classification

References

Tour de Langkawi
Tour de Langkawi
Tour de Langkawi